Two units of the Royal Australian Navy (RAN) have been named HMAS Maitland, after the city of Maitland, New South Wales.

 , a naval base in Newcastle, New South Wales which was active from 1940 until 1946.
 , an Armidale-class patrol boat commissioned in 2006 and active as of 2016

Royal Australian Navy ship names